Saša Simonović (born 20 July 1975) is a former Serbian footballer who played as a midfielder.

Career
Simonović began his career with Radnički Niš, playing for the team between 1988 and 1994. He also played for Železničar Niš, Aris Thessaloniki and Obilić, before moving to Levski Sofia in 2002 for a fee of €750,000. He scored his first goal for the club in his first match against CSKA Sofia. In three seasons, Simonović earned 83 appearances for Levski and scored 20 goals. In June 2005 Simonović transferred to Vihren Sandanski.

From 2006 to 2008, Simonović played for Slavia Sofia. In the 2008–09 season he was a part of Lokomotiv Mezdra.

On 5 August 2009, it was announced that Simonović would return to Levski. He signed a two-year contract with the club. Simonović made his second debut for Levski on 15 August 2009 in a match against Minyor Pernik.

In total, Simonović appeared in more than 150 matches in the A PFG.

Honours
Levski Sofia
 Bulgarian League: 2002
 Bulgarian Cup: 2002, 2003, 2005
 Bulgarian Supercup: 2005

References

External links

1975 births
Living people
Serbian footballers
Serbia and Montenegro international footballers
Serbian expatriate footballers
FK Radnički Niš players
FK Obilić players
First Professional Football League (Bulgaria) players
PFC Levski Sofia players
OFC Vihren Sandanski players
PFC Slavia Sofia players
PFC Lokomotiv Mezdra players
Expatriate footballers in Bulgaria
Association football midfielders
Serbian expatriate sportspeople in Bulgaria
Expatriate footballers in Greece
Serbia and Montenegro expatriate footballers
Serbia and Montenegro footballers
Serbia and Montenegro expatriate sportspeople in Bulgaria
Serbia and Montenegro expatriate sportspeople in Greece